Bloodshy & Avant are a Swedish songwriting and production duo consisting of Christian "Bloodshy" Karlsson and Pontus "Avant" Winnberg. They have worked with many prominent artists, including  Britney Spears, Kylie Minogue, Ms. Dynamite, Madonna, Jennifer Lopez, Katy Perry, Kelis, Girls' Generation, Christina Milian, Sky Ferreira, Hikaru Utada and BoA. In addition to their production work, Karlsson and Winnberg are also members of the synth-pop group Miike Snow, alongside lead vocalist Andrew Wyatt.

Career

Original songs and production
Bloodshy and Avant scored their first success working with American singer/songwriter Christina Milian for her début album. The collaboration resulted in two hit singles, "AM to PM," and "When You Look at Me," both of which hit number three on the UK Singles Chart.

They were then commissioned to work with UK hip-hop singer/rapper, Ms. Dynamite and BRIT Award-winning English pop group Sugababes. The collaboration with Ms. Dynamite resulted in several tracks which appeared on her début album, A Little Deeper, including her hit début single, "It Takes More". They also produced tracks for her 2005 second release, Judgement Days.

Bloodshy and Avant co-wrote and produced two songs which appeared on Britney Spears' 2003 album In the Zone: the hit single, "Toxic", that merited a Grammy award; and "Showdown". They also produced all the three new songs on her 2004 Greatest Hits: My Prerogative album and the theme song for Britney & Kevin: Chaotic series. They subsequently worked with Spears on her fifth studio album, Blackout, for which they collaborated with Spears on four songs: the hit single, "Piece of Me", "Radar", "Freakshow" and "Toy Soldier"; and again on her 2008 follow-up album Circus, for which they produced the songs "Unusual You", "Phonography" and "Trouble", the latter two appeared only as bonus tracks. Bloodshy alone co-produced two songs for Britney Spears' 7th studio album Femme Fatale, "How I Roll" and "Trip to Your Heart".

The duo co-wrote and co-produced two tracks with Madonna, "How High" and "Like It or Not", for her 2005 Confessions on a Dance Floor album.

In 2007, for Kylie Minogue's 10th studio album X, Bloodshy and Avant co-wrote and produced "Speakerphone", "Nu-di-ty" and "Cherry Bomb", the latter appeared only on CD singles.

In 2008, Bloodshy and Avant produced few songs for BoA's English début BoA.
A year later they produced "Chocolate Love" for South Korean girl groups Girls' Generation and f(x).

In 2010 Bloodshy signed Sky Ferreira and produced songs like  "One", "17" and "Haters Anonymous"

Remixes and other projects
Bloodshy & Avant have also gained fame by remixes. They have remixed songs from Britney Spears (Songs they also wrote and produced the originals of) including a remix for "Piece of Me" which charted number one on the US Billboard Hot Club Play chart. Also other remixes for "Toxic" and "Me Against the Music" have topped the US Billboard charts.

Outside of being Bloodshy and Avant, Christian and Pontus are in a band together with Andrew Wyatt called Miike Snow.  They also run a label called Ändersson with signed artists and musicians including Little Majorette, Sky Ferreira and Meadow (a project with their friends Sebastian Ingrosso and Steve Angello. They are also working on the music for a videogame with EA Games/Dice to be released in 2010.

Winnberg is a member of a band called Amason together with Gustav Ejstes, Idiot Wind (Amanda Bergman Mattson), Nils Törnqvist and Petter Winnberg.
Karlsson and Linus Eklöw comprise the band Galantis. Wyatt and Winnberg were among 13 founding members of Swedish artist collective and record label INGRID.

Studio Robotberget
Bloodshy and Avant own a studio based in a 150-year-old fire station in the middle of Söder, Stockholm.

Studio Gear & Recording Equipment

Roland System
Korg MS-20
Korg VC-10 Vocoder
Yamaha CP80
Ondes Martenot
Theremin by Leon Theremin
Viggen Debutant
Wurlitzer
August Hoffman Piano
RCA BA25
Gates Sta-Level
Chandler LTD1, LTD2, TG1, TG2

SSL Bus Compressor
API 1608
LM Ericsson Preamps
EMT 240
AKG BX20
Roland Space Echo
AKG C12
AKG C24
Neumann M49
Neumann SM2
Coles 4038

Awards
ASCAP Award for Most Performed Song - "Toxic" - 2005 
ASCAP Award  - "Toxic" - 2004
Grammy Award - Best Dance Recording - "Toxic" - 2005
Ivor Novello Award - Performing Right Society (PRS) Most Performed Work - "Toxic" - 2005
Swedish Government - Music Export Award 2007
SMFF Award - 2006

Discography

2020

From Jamie Lynn Spears and Chantel Jeffries's Follow Me (Zoey 101) - Single
"Follow Me (Zoey 101)" - written and produced by Bloodshy & Avant

From Carly Rae Jepsen's Dedicated Side B
"Let's Sort the Whole Thing Out" - written and produced by Avant
"Now I Don't Hate California After All" - written and produced by Avant

2019
From Carly Rae Jepsen's Dedicated
"For Sure" - written and produced by Avant

2016

MishCatt - EP (produced by Avant)

From Miike Snow's iii
"My Trigger"
"The Heart of Me"
"Genghis Khan"
"Heart Is Full"
"For U" (featuring Charli XCX)
"I Feel the Weight"
"Back of the Car"
"Lonely Life"
"Over and Over"
"Longshot (7 Nights)"

2015

David Guetta
"Bang My Head" - written by Christian Bloodshy Karlsson
Hilary Duff
"Sparks" - produced by Bloodshy

2014
Charli XCX
"Die Tonight" - written by Avant

2013
Katy Perry
"Love Me" - produced by Bloodshy

2012
From Miike Snow's Happy to You
"Enter the Joker's Lair"  	
"The Wave"  	
"Devil's Work"  	
"Vase"
God Help This Divorce"  	
"Bavarian #1 (Say You Will)"  	
"Pretender"  	
"Archipelago"
"Black Tin Box" (featuring Lykke Li)	
"Paddling Out"

2011
From Depeche Mode's Remixes 81-11
"Tora Tora Tora" Karlsson & Winnberg remix
"When the body speaks" Karlsson & Winnberg remix
From Sky Ferreira's As If!
"Haters Anonymous"
"108"
"One"
From Britney Spears' Femme Fatale
"How I Roll" produced by Bloodshy
"Trip to Your Heart" produced by Bloodshy

2010
"Sabali" Amadou & Mariam - Miike Snow remix
From Miike Snow's Miike Snow Deluxe Version
"The Rabbit"
"Silvia" (Robotberget Remix)
From Dangerous Muse's Take Control
"Homewrecker"
"I Want It All"

2009

From Miike Snow's Miike Snow
 "Animal"
 "Burial"
 "Silvia"
 "Song for No One"
 "Black & Blue"
 "Sans Soleil"
 "A Horse Is Not a Home"
 "Cult Logic"
 "Plastic Jungle"
 "In Search Of"
 "Faker"
 "Billie Holiday" (bonus track)

From f(x)'s Chocolate Love
 "Chocolate Love (Electronic Pop Version)"

From Girls' Generation's Chocolate Love
 "Chocolate Love (Retro Pop Version)"

From BoA's Best & USA
 "Universe"

From BoA's BoA
 "Did Ya"
 "Touched"

2008

From Lisa's Got that Fever
 "Leave"

From Maroon 5's Call and Response: The Remix Album
 "Little of Your Time"

From Britney Spears' Circus
"Unusual You"
"Phonography"
"Trouble" (iTunes pre-order bonus track)

From Crystal Kay's Namida no Saki ni (涙のさきに; Beyond the Tears)
"Dream World" (SOIDOG MIX) Remixed with Jonback
"Namida no Saki ni (涙のさきに; Beyond the Tears)" (SOIDOG MIX) Remixed with Jonback"

From Crystal Kay's Color Change!
"It's a Crime"

From Sean Garrett's Turbo 919
"Turbo 919"

From Leon Jean Marie's Bent out of shape
"You Must Know"
"Bring It On"
"Fair"
"East End Blues"
"Jumpin Off the Block"
Spiss - "My Slang"

2007

From Britney Spears' Blackout
"Piece of Me" (UK #2, US #18) 3 time VMA winner
"Radar" (co-produced by The Clutch) (US #88, SWE #8)
"Freakshow"
"Toy Soldier"
"Piece of Me" (Böz o Lö remix)  (US club play #1)
"Radar" (Bloodshy & Avant remix)

From Jennifer Lopez's Brave
"Brave"
"Brave" (Bloodshy radio edit)

From Jordin Sparks' Jordin Sparks
"See My Side"
"Shy Boy"
"Young and in Love"

From Kevin Michael
"We All Want the Same Thing" featuring Lupe Fiasco
"Hoodbuzzin"
"Lollipop" (unreleased)

From Kylie Minogue's X
"Nu-di-ty"
"Speakerphone"
"Cherry Bomb"  b-side to "Wow" and "In My Arms" single 

From the soundtrack Music and Lyrics: Music from the Motion Picture
"Haley Bennett - Buddha's Delight"

2006
From Belinda's Utopia
"Good... Good"
From Kelis' Kelis Was Here
"Fire" featuring Spragga Benz
From Natalie's Everything  New
"Dance With Me"
From Zoey 101: Music Mix''
"Follow Me"  Instrumental version featured on soundtrack

2005
From Britney Spears' Someday (I Will Understand) - CD Single and Britney & Kevin: Chaotic (EP)
"Chaotic"
"Mona Lisa"

From Brooke Valentine's Chain Letter
"Blah-Blah-Blah" featuring Ol Dirty Bastard
"American Girl"
"Thrill of the Chase"

From Madonna's Confessions on a Dancefloor
"How High"
"Like It or Not"

From Rob Thomas' ...Something to Be
"This Is How a Heart Breaks"

From Utada's  Exodus
"You Make Me Want to Be a Man" (remix)

2004
From Britney Spears' Greatest Hits: My Prerogative
"My Prerogative" (UK #3)
"Do Somethin'" (UK #6, US #100)
"I've Just Begun (Having My Fun)"

From Christina Milian's It's About Time
"I Need More"

From Ms. Dynamite's Judgement Days
"Not Today" (#7 UK)
"Shavaar" (#7 UK)

2003
From Britney Spears' In the Zone
"Toxic" (UK #1, US #9)  Grammy award winner
"Showdown"
"Me Against the Music" (Bloodshy & Avant's Chix mix) (US club play #1)
"Me Against the Music" (featuring Madonna) (Bloodshy & Avant “Dubbie Style” remix)
"Toxic" (Bloodshy & Avant's Intoxicated remix) (US club play #1)
"Take Off" (unreleased)
"Look Who's Talking Now" (unreleased)

From Rachel Stevens' Funky Dory
"Sweet Dreams My LA Ex" (UK #2)
"Glide"

From Billy Crawford's Ride
"The Way She Rocks My World" (bonus track)

From Ruby Amanfu's Sugah
"Some of That Marley"

From Lene Nystrøm's Play With Me
"Up in Smoke"

2002
From Christina Milian's Christina Milian
"AM to PM"  (#3 UK, #27 US)
"When You Look at Me" (#3 UK)
"You Make Me Laugh"
"Got to Have You"
"Last Call"
"Snooze You Lose"

From Ms. Dynamite's A Little Deeper
"It Takes More" (Bloodshy Main mix) - (#7 UK)
"Brother"
"Put Him Out" - (A Little Deeper) (#28 UK)
"Krazy Krush"
"Get Up, Stand Up"

From Sugababes' Angels with Dirty Faces
"Supernatural"

From Samantha Mumba's The Collection
"I'm Right Here"

2001
Infinite Mass - "She's a Freak"
Infinite Mass - "People Talk"
Ultra Nate - "Get It Up"
Ultra Nate - "I Ain't Looking for Nothing"
Amanda - "You Don't Stand A Chance"
Amanda - "Call Me"
Amanda - "Crush On You"
Stella Soleil - "Let's Just Go to Bed"
Vitamin C - "Busted"
Vitamin C - "I Can't Say No"

References

External links

Swedish songwriters
Swedish composers
Grammy Award winners
Miike Snow members